Nadirah X aka Nadz born Nadirah Sabreen Seid, April 19, is a Jamaican rap/hip hop poet.

Career

In 2002, Nadirah (also known as Nadz) won the Irie FM / CME Big Break competition which led to a performance at Island Village where she met Brian Jobson and Dave Stewart from the Eurythmics. Stewart immediately invited Nadirah to England. Impressed, Stewart signed her to his European-based label. She began touring Europe as the third member of DUP. Featured on the tours were Joanne Shaw Taylor, Candy Dulfer and Jimmy Cliff, with whom Nadz wrote and recorded "Positive Mind" for his album Fantastic Plastic People. Later that year Nadz won Best New Female Artist in Jamaica.

In 2003, Nadirah was commissioned by Coca-Cola to do a jingle for their Real Campaign in the Caribbean at the same time her track "I Hate This" was a part of the Lara Croft Tomb Raider: The Cradle of Life movie soundtrack. She also sang on and co-wrote the "Peace One Day" theme song with Dave Stewart, Camar, Mudbone and Jimmy Cliff.

In 2004, Nadirah appeared on the soundtrack for the film Alfie, singing the title track with Joss Stone and Rolling Stones lead man Mick Jagger.

In 2006, Nadirah recorded an album with Mudbone (P-Funk and Parlaimant fame) called FreshMud the album was released in Europe and received rave reviews  which led them to open for Pink on her European tour before headlining a club tour of their own.

Nadirah and Dave wrote and performed the Go Green (GreenPeace Anthem) featuring recording artists such as Annie Lennox, Sarah McLachlan, Natalie Imbruglia, Imogen Heap and Bonnie Raitt. It was released on April 17, 2007. In May, Nadirah travelled to Beijing, China to perform on the final night of the four-day Midi Rock Music Festival, the largest outdoor music festival in China.

In 2008, Nadirah appeared on and co-wrote Annie Lennox's song "Womankind", which was featured in the 2008 film The Women.

Nadirah began writing and recording with Greek singer Anna Vissi in 2009 for Anna's English album with production from Patrick Leonard (Madonna), Dave Stewart and Glenn Ballard.

Nadirah landed the lead role in Tim Kring's and Nokia's Conspiracy For Good campaign. is a fictional organisation that is part of an "augmented reality drama" game developed by Heroes creator Tim Kring, funded and technologically enabled by Nokia and realized by the company P, and over 100 people in production teams in five different countries. In 2010, London witnessed the launch of the Conspiracy For Good, a radical new form of entertainment called "Social Benefit Storytelling", which allowed for people to participate inside a fictional story... to do real good in the real world. The pilot spanned the globe and culminated with 4 weeks of live events and gameplay in London streets. As a result, the Conspiracy For Good succeeded in building/stocking 5 libraries in Africa, funding 50 scholarships for schoolgirls and generating over 10,000 books for the Zambian libraries through WeGiveBooks.org. On February 22, 2011, the Conspiracy For Good was nominated for an International Digital Emmy Award.

Later that year, Nadirah was invited to Brazil to perform at the Back to Black Festival.

In 2011 Nadirah's debut album Ink was released through Magic Records/Universal Poland. The album was executive produced by Dave Stewart and producers are Glen Ballard (Alanis Morissette's Jagged Little Pill and Michael Jackson's "Man in the Mirror"), Dave Stewart (Eurythmics), Ned Douglas (Katy Perry, Anastacia, Stevie Nicks), Swish (Bishop Lamonth, Royce da 5'9") and Michael Bradford (Kid Rock, Uncle Cracker and Anita Baker). Later that year Nadirah was asked to perform for HRH Crown Prince Haakon (Norway), Professor Pekka Himanen (Finland) and founder of Operation HOPE, John Hope Bryant (United States) and Bishop Desmond Tutu at the Global Dignity Concert in Finland. Nadirah wrote the Dignity Day theme song with Dave Stewart.

In 2012, Nadirah X and Jon Fields pka Swish released an EP under the Mr & Mrs name, as a free download. The EP received positive reviews in The Huffington Post and LA Weekly, which praised his production style and their lyrical ability. Dave Stewart is quoted as saying, "It's refreshing seeing a married couple working intensely together rapping about stuff that directly relates to them and their situation: one so many other couples can relate to."

Nadirah supported Jamaican songstress Italee on a European tour in 2017.

Nadirah has just released a book of poetry, Never From Nowhere.

Personal life
Nadirah grew up in an Islamic home in Jamaica, one of her older brothers Melvin Jr (Mr. E) who was a DJ in the early 1990s introduced her to the music of such artists as Queen Latifah, Will Smith and A Tribe Called Quest. She was immediately drawn to writing rap flows and poetry. Her first recordings were with Herbie Harris (Third World), Andy Livingston and Sly and Robbie (Riddim Twins). Nadirah is extremely close to her family and credits her mother Carmen as her inspiration to strive each day to do what is right.

Influences
Nadirah X states her influences to be Queen Latifah, Nas, The Roots, Bob Marley, Mos Def, Lauryn Hill, Nina Simone, Jimmy Cliff, and Peter Tosh.

Discography
" Nobody's Coming " feat Olaf Blackwood Released January 22, 2022
"I Hate This (M-Phatic Mix)" (Lara Croft: Tomb Raider: The Cradle of Life Sdtk) on Hollywood Records
Alfie soundtrack "Wicked Time" with Joss Stone and Mick Jagger 
"Womankind" with Annie Lennox (Annie Lennox's album Songs of Mass Destruction and the movie The Women)
Ink the EP
"Go Green" single featuring Annie Lennox, Imogen Heap, Sarah McLachlan, and Natalie Imbruglia
"Fresh Mud" album Mudbone featuring Nadirah X
"Ordinary Girl" from ABC's Lincoln Heights
Ink the full album
UK FLUE Compilation - "Fight for Music" featuring J.Sol
"Testimony" for Conspiracy For Good
"The World Is Yours" with Jimmy Cliff from Fantastic Plastic People
"Dignity" for Global Dignity Day
Peace One Day theme song with Jimmy Cliff, Mudbone Cooper, Dave Stewart

Ink

Track listing and credits
Executive producer: Dave Stewart

 "Testimony" - written by Nadirah X and Glen Ballard. Produced by Glen Ballard.
 "Here It Comes" - written by Nadirah X, Ned Douglas, Dave Stewart and Annie Lennox. Produced by Dave Stewart and Ned Douglas
 "Under the Rainbow" - written by Nadirah X and Glen Ballard. Produced by Glen Ballard.
 "Blood on our Hands" - written by Nadirah X, Ned Douglas Produced by Ned Douglas
 "Judas Blood" (featuring Swish) - written by Nadirah X and Jonathan 'Swish' Whitfield. Produced by Swish
 "Finger on the Trigger" - written by Nadirah X, Ned Douglas Produced by Ned Douglas
 "Good Day" (featuring Carina Round) - written by Nadirah X, Ned Douglas Produced by Ned Douglas
 "Tuff Lyfe" - written by Nadirah X and Michael Bradford. Produced by Michael Bradford
 "Ink" - written by Nadirah X
 "These Times" (featuring Amy Keys) - written by Nadirah X and Glen Ballard. Produced by Glen Ballard.
 "Ordinary Girl" - written by Nadirah X, Ned Douglas Produced by Ned Douglas
 "Negativity" - written by Nadirah X, Ned Douglas Produced by Ned Douglas
 "I Hate This" (Weapons Mix) - written by Nadirah X and Dave Stewart. Produced by Dave Stewart and Ned Douglas
 "Reqless" (featuring DNA) - written by Nadirah X, Derrick 'DNA' Ashong and Michael Bradford. Produced by Michael Bradford

References

External links
 Official site
 Myspace site

Living people
Year of birth missing (living people)
21st-century Jamaican women singers